Horse's Ghost was a Sioux Chief in Montana at the Fort Peck Indian Reservation who advocated for Native American rights with members of President Taft's administration.

Biography
In 1911 he went to Washington with Major Charles B. Lohmiller to advocate for Native American rights with members of President Taft's administration.

In 1913 he took part in the National Reliability Tour sponsored by the American Automobile Association.

References

Native American leaders
20th-century Native Americans
Fort Peck Assiniboine and Sioux Tribes people